Ecotropic viral integration site 5 protein homolog is a protein that in humans is encoded by the EVI5 gene.

Model organisms
Model organisms have been used in the study of EVI5 function. A conditional knockout mouse line called Evi5tm1a(KOMP)Wtsi was generated at the Wellcome Trust Sanger Institute. Male and female animals underwent a standardized phenotypic screen to determine the effects of deletion. Additional screens performed:  - In-depth immunological phenotyping

References

Further reading